Goxhill railway station serves the village of Goxhill in North Lincolnshire, England. It was built by the Great Grimsby and Sheffield Junction Railway in 1848.

It is the last station, when travelling from Cleethorpes towards Barton, to still have two platforms and the original station buildings. The buildings are no longer in railway use (the station has been unstaffed since 1969) and are in private ownership. The station signal box controls a nearby level crossing that still (as of summer 2016) has manually-wound wooden gates rather than modern lifting barriers.  Since the main line was re-signalled in January 2016, the box has become the 'fringe' on this route to the York Rail Operating Centre.

Between 1911 and 1963, it was also the junction for the Barton & Immingham Light Railway line to  via . This route was single line throughout and left the present route just south of the station.

Facilities
The station is unmanned and has only basic amenities - a single shelter on the southbound platform, a payphone and timetable poster boards on each side.  Tickets must be purchased prior to travel or on the train. Step-free access is available to each side via the level crossing.

Goxhill Station was notable for being the last operational British Rail railway station to retain original Eastern Region of British Railways enamelled "totem" signs on the platform lamp-posts - one or two of these were dark-reddish/maroon rather than Eastern Region ultramarine dark blue, the reason for this being unclear. These totems were finally replaced with more modern-style signage towards the end of 1988.

Services
All services at Goxhill are operated by East Midlands Railway using Class 156 DMUs.

There is a Sunday service of four trains per day in each direction during the summer months only. There are no winter Sunday services at the station.

Services were previously operated by Northern Trains but transferred to East Midlands Railway as part of the May 2021 timetable changes.

References

References

Sources

External links 

2011 Photo of Station, looking south (Geograph.org)

Railway stations in the Borough of North Lincolnshire
DfT Category F2 stations
Former Great Central Railway stations
Railway stations in Great Britain opened in 1848
Railway stations served by East Midlands Railway
Former Northern franchise railway stations